Dagoberto Rodríguez Barrera (born 1955 in Cuba) is a Cuban diplomat. From August 2001 to 2007, he was the Chief of the Cuban Interests Section. Prior to being the Chief of the Cuban Interests Section he was the Head of the Cuban Foreign Ministry's Department on North America.  He is currently the Cuban Ambassador in Venezuela.

References
 Veteran Cuban Diplomat Being Sent To Post In Cuba, The Miami Herald, November 7, 2007, Page 7A
 Cambios En Seccion De Intereses Cubana, El Nuevo Herald, July 12, 2001, Page 3A (Spanish)

1955 births
Living people
Cuban diplomats